Bhanupli–Leh line is an under-construction high-elevation all-weather  wide gauge railway track connecting Bhanupli in Punjab to Leh in Ladakh union territory of India. The 465km long line, at the height of 5360m above mean sea level, with 10 hours travel time from New Delhi to Leh, will become the highest railway in the world surpassing the Qinghai–Tibet railway in China at 5068m.

The Bhanupli-Leh line, with the total length of  excluding the  Leh-Sasherthang military rail link, will cost INR99,000 crore (~US$12.4 billion) including INR62,0000 crore (~US$7.75 billion) for the tunnels and bridges. Construction will be completed in phases, Phase-0 Bhanupli to Beri-Barmana (Bilaspur), Phase-1 Beri-Barmana to Mandi, Phase-2 Mandi to Manali, Phase-3 Manali to Upshi, Phase-4 Upshi to Leh, Phase-5 Leh to Sasherthang 13 km extension link for the Indian Military. Bhanupli-Leh line would link to the Indian railway network via the 63.1km long under-construction railway line from the existing Bhanupli railway station in Punjab (on existing Ambala-Sirhind-Una rail line) to Barmana in Bilaspur district in Himachal Pradesh. As of Feb 2022, the completion date for the under-construction phase-0 Bhanupli to Barmana (Bilaspur) track is 2025. For the phase-1 Barmana to Leh line the land acquisition has commenced for the Barmana to Mandi section.

This is one of the four important railway connections along the border with China identified by the Defence Ministry. Post Galwan clash with China, The Government of India expedited the land acquisition for the project.

Timeline 
 March 2012: The railway ministry sent the project to the Planning Commission for appraisal. 

 December 2016: The  Bhanupli–Leh rail FLS (Final Location Survey) was approved at a cost of ₹345 crore. The railway had requested the LAHDC to provide adequate land for setting up a camp office in Ladakh, and the required infrastructure. 

 April 2017: The government informed that the Final location Survey (FSL) for these will be completed by the October 2020. In June 2017, the foundation stone was laid by then Railway Minister Suresh Prabhu to mark the commencement of FSL.

 December 2021: DPR (Detailed Project Report) for the 13 km long Leh-Sasherthang rail link for military logistics was completed.

 February 2022: Land acquisition for (Barmana) Bilaspur to Mandi section of Phase-1 (Barmana to Leh) started in 10 villages of Bilaspur district of Himachal Pradesh state. 

 May 2022, the completion date for phase-0 is 2025, 7 tunnels of Phase-0a (Bhanupli to Dharot) have been constructed and track laying work has commenced, Phase-0b (Dharot to Bilaspur) tenders have been allocated and construction has already started.

Progress 

Bhanupli-Leh railway line project will require the acquisition of 1100 hectares of land, of which 26% is forest land, costing INR11,500 crore (US$8.5 billion). 150 km of approach roads will be constructed.

Phase-0: Bhanupli to Barmana (Bilaspur), 63.1 km  

Phase-0, from the existing Bhanupli railway station in Rupnagar district of Punjab state on Ambala-Sirhind-Una railway line to Barmana in Bilaspur district in Himachal Pradesh state, has total track length of 63.1 km, 20 tunnels of total 25 km length, 24 bridges of total 6 km length and 2 viaducts of 2 km length. Of these, only seven tunnels are part of phase-0a (Bhanupli in Punjab to Dharot in Naina Devi tehsil of Bilaspur district of Himachal Pradesh). The rest of the tunnels and both viaducts are in phase-0b. There are five main stations in this phase, one in Punjab at Thural, and 4 in Himachal Pradesh at Dharot, Jagatkhana, Bilaspur and Barmana.

Phase-1: (Barmana) Bilaspur to Mandi, ?? km, under land acquisition 

Land acquisition between Barmana and Mandi for this phase is underway as of May 2022.

Phase-2: Mandi to Manali, ?? km, under land acquisition 

This section lies entirely within Himachal Pradesh.

Phase-3: Manali to Upshi, ?? km, under land acquisition 

This section connects  Himachal Pradesh to Ladakh.

Phase-4: Upshi to Leh, ?? km, under land acquisition 

This section lies entirely within Ladakh.

Phase-5: Leh to Sasherthang military link, 13 km, under planning 

This section, which lies entirely within Ladakh, will serve Indian military's logistics needs on India-China LAC, India-Pakistan LOC in Ladakh and Kashmir, and India-Pakistan AGPL in Siachen. This section has a tunnel and a bridge.

Infrastructure and construction
After Jammu–Baramulla line, Bhanupli–Leh line will be the most challenging railway project in Indian Railways due to high mountains, a large number of tunnels and high bridges and severe cold weather.

To cater to military logistics, the loop line will be constructed at five stations for the exclusive use of military loading and unloading at Karu, Sissu, Debring, Leh and Sesharthang. The rail line will be extended 13 km from Leh to Sesharthang to meet military logistics needs.

See also

 List of highest railway stations in the world

References

External links
 Google map of the existing and planned route with additional spurs

Proposed railway lines in India

Rail transport in Punjab, India
Rail transport in Himachal Pradesh
Rail transport in Ladakh
5 ft 6 in gauge railways in India
Transport in Bilaspur, Himachal Pradesh
Transport in Leh